Trevor David Pinnock  (born 16 December 1946 in Canterbury, England) is a British harpsichordist and conductor.

He is best known for his association with the period-performance orchestra The English Concert, which he helped found and directed from the keyboard for over 30 years in baroque and classical music. He is a former artistic director of Canada's National Arts Centre Orchestra and founded The Classical Band in New York.

Since his resignation from The English Concert in 2003, Pinnock has continued his career as a conductor, appearing with major orchestras and opera companies around the world. He has also performed and recorded as a harpsichordist in solo and chamber music and conducted and otherwise trained student groups at conservatoires. Trevor Pinnock won a Gramophone Award for his recording of Bach's Brandenburg Concertos with the European Brandenburg Ensemble, an occasional orchestra formed to mark his 60th birthday.

Biography and career

Early life
Trevor Pinnock was born in Canterbury, where his grandfather had run a Salvation Army band. His father was Kenneth Alfred Thomas Pinnock, a publisher, and his mother, Joyce Edith, née Muggleton, was an amateur singer. In Canterbury, the Pinnock family lived near the pianist Ronald Smith, from whose sister Pinnock had piano lessons. He became a chorister at Canterbury Cathedral when he was seven, attending the choir school from 1956 to 1961 and subsequently Simon Langton Grammar School for Boys. After receiving instruction in piano and organ, he served as a church organist; by the time he was 15, he began to play the harpsichord. At age 19, he won a Foundation Scholarship to the Royal College of Music to study organ and he also studied harpsichord, winning prizes for performance on both instruments. His teachers were Ralph Downes and Millicent Silver. A strong early influence was Gustav Leonhardt, though he did not study with him.

Instrumentalist
As a harpsichordist, Pinnock toured Europe with the Academy of St. Martin in the Fields. While a student at the RCM, he was told by the registrar, John Stainer, that it would be impossible to make a living as a harpsichordist. He made his London debut at the Royal Festival Hall in 1966 with the Galliard Harpsichord Trio, which he co-founded with Stephen Preston, flute, and Anthony Pleeth, cello. At this stage, they were playing baroque music on modern instruments. His solo harpsichord debut was in 1968 at the Purcell Room in London.

To maximise his possibilities for work early on in his career, he included in his repertoire not only the regular baroque repertoire, but also modern harpsichord concertos, including Roberto Gerhard's concerto for harpsichord, percussion and strings, Manuel de Falla's concerto for harpsichord, Frank Martin's Petite symphonie concertante for harp, harpsichord, piano and double string orchestra and Francis Poulenc's Concert Champêtre. Pinnock and Maxim Vengerov toured together in 2000, with Vengerov taking up the baroque violin for the first time and Pinnock taking up the modern grand piano. These concerts consisted of a first half of harpsichord and baroque violin, followed by a second half of piano and modern violin.

The English Concert
In November 1972 the Galliard Trio expanded to become The English Concert, an orchestra specialising in performances of baroque and classical music on period instruments. The orchestra initially started with seven members but soon grew in size. The decision to move to period performance was taken for a number of reasons:

Pinnock was at the forefront of the period performance movement and the revitalisation of the baroque repertoire; the reaction of Leonard Bernstein to his performances is typical: "In my opinion, the work of the conductor Trevor Pinnock in this area is particularly exciting – his performances of Bach and Handel make me jump out of my seat!"

The English Concert's London debut was at the English Bach Festival in 1973. In 1975, Pinnock played the harpsichord in the first-ever performance of Rameau's last opera, Les Boréades, under John Eliot Gardiner.
He toured North America with The English Concert for the first time in 1983; he had earlier spent two periods as Artist in Residence at Washington University in St. Louis. His debut at The Proms was in 1980; he later directed Handel's oratorio Solomon in 1986 and many other large-scale works with his orchestra. They toured worldwide and made numerous recordings, Pinnock directing "with a characteristic energy and enthusiasm which are readily communicated to audiences." The Choir of the English Concert was at first an ad-hoc group of singers assembled as needed, originally in 1983 for the first 20th-century performance of Rameau's Acante et Céphise; it became an established choir for a period from the mid-1990s at the time they were performing Bach's Mass in B minor. This allowed the ensemble to regularly perform baroque operas, oratorios and other vocal works; a series of Bach's major choral works followed.

He directed The English Concert, usually from the harpsichord or chamber organ, for over 30 years, deciding, with the other orchestra members, to hand it over to violinist Andrew Manze in 2003. He explained the decision as follows:

Other conducting projects
In 1989 Pinnock founded The Classical Band in New York, signing an 18-disc recording contract with Deutsche Grammophon before the ensemble's first rehearsal. He led the group in performances of the classical and romantic repertoire from Haydn to Mendelssohn on period instruments, including playing as fortepiano soloist. After a disappointing series of concerts, he resigned in 1990 and was succeeded by Bruno Weil.

From 1991 to 1996 he was artistic director and principal conductor of the National Arts Centre Orchestra in Ottawa, a group he had first directed in 1985. He subsequently served as its artistic advisor during the 1996–1997 and 1997–1998 seasons, including a tour of the US with the performance and recording of Beethoven's 1st and 5th piano concertos with Grigory Sokolov as soloist. He has made occasional return visits to the orchestra since relinquishing his formal position with them.

Guest conducting
He has appeared frequently as a guest conductor with many of the world's leading orchestras, including the Boston, City of Birmingham, San Francisco and Detroit symphony orchestras, the Saint Paul, Los Angeles and Mito chamber orchestras, the Freiburger Barockorchester, Philharmonia Baroque Orchestra, Mozarteum Orchestra of Salzburg, Berlin Philharmoniker, Vienna Philharmonic Orchestra, Austro-Hungarian Haydn Orchestra, the Chicago Symphony Orchestra and London Philharmonic Orchestra and at the Tanglewood, Mostly Mozart and Salzburg festivals. He is a regular guest conductor of the Leipzig Gewandhaus Orchestra and Deutsche Kammerphilharmonie

He made his Metropolitan Opera debut in 1988 conducting Handel's opera Giulio Cesare, the same year he made his debut at the Salzburg Festival with Handel's Messiah.
He conducted Opera Australia and Michael Chance in Handel's Rinaldo at the Sydney Opera House in 2005. He also played William Babell's virtuoso harpsichord transcriptions with some of the arias (which Babell claimed were of Handel's actual improvisations).

Recent years

Since resigning his position with The English Concert, Pinnock has divided his time between performing as a harpsichordist and conducting both modern- and period-instrument orchestras. He has also taken an interest in educational projects.

In 2004 he commissioned modern harpsichord music by English composer John Webb, whose Surge (2004) "is built up over an implacable rhythmic repeat-figure. Though neither is explicitly tonal, each skilfully avoids the merely percussive effect that the harpsichord's complex overtones can all too easily impart to more densely dissonant music." He has also played the same composer's Ebb (2000), which "comprises a spasmodic discourse against a manic background of descending scale patterns like a kind of out-of-kilter change-ringing".

He toured Europe and the Far East in 2007 with the European Brandenburg Ensemble, a baroque orchestra, formed to mark his 60th birthday by recording Bach's Brandenburg Concertos and performing popular baroque music. Its recording of the concertos won the Gramophone Award for Baroque Instrumental in 2008. The band was not a permanent orchestra, but planned to reconvene in 2011 when Bach's St John Passion was to be the focus of their work.

Pinnock's educational work takes place both in the United Kingdom and elsewhere. It includes being principal guest conductor of the Royal Academy of Music's Concert Orchestra, taking masterclasses or workshops at other British universities, and conducting the orchestras of such establishments as Mozarteum University of Salzburg and The Hong Kong Academy for Performing Arts. He has also taught a handful of harpsichordists including Lars Ulrik Mortensen, Nicholas Parle, Carole Cerasi and Julian Perkins.

Degrees and honours 
Pinnock gained ARCM Hons (organ) (1965), FRCM (1996), and Hon. FRAM (1988). His honorary doctorates include those from the University of Ottawa (D. University) in 1993, the University of Kent (DMus) in 1995, and the University of Sheffield (DMus) in 2005.

He was appointed a Commander of the Order of the British Empire in 1992 and an Officier of the French Ordre des Arts et des Lettres in 1998.

Recordings 
Each original release is listed. Years are those of recording.

Solo harpsichord

By composer
J. S. Bach: toccatas 910 & 912, prelude and fugue in A minor BWV 894, fantasia in C minor BWV 906, Chromatic Fantasia and Fugue BWV 903 (1978)
J. S. Bach: toccatas 911, 913–916 (1977)
J. S. Bach: Partitas for harpsichord BWV 825–830 (1985)
J. S. Bach: Partitas for harpsichord BWV 825–830, Hänssler Classics (1998–1999)
J. S. Bach: Goldberg Variations BWV 988 (1980)
J. S. Bach: Italian Concerto BWV 971, concerto after Vivaldi (op.3 no.9) BWV 972 and French Overture BWV 831 (1979)
J. S. Bach: French suite no.5 BWV 816, English suite no.3 BWV 808, chromatic fantasia and fugue BWV 903 and preludes and fugues BWV 846, 876, 881 from The Well-Tempered Clavier (1992)
J. S. Bach: The Well-Tempered Clavier I, DG (2020)
J. S. Bach: The Well-Tempered Clavier II, DG (2022)
Handel: harpsichord suites and chaconne HWV 434, 441, 436, 438, 435
Rameau: Complete harpsichord works, CRD records
Rameau: Les Cyclopes (Suites in A minor and E minor), Avie records (2005)
Scarlatti: Sonatas Kk. 46, 87, 95, 99, 124, 201, 204a, 490, 491, 492, 513, 520, 521; CRD 3368 (1997; 1981 as LP)
Scarlatti: Sonatas Kk. 460, 461, 478, 479, 502, 516, 517, 518, 519, 529, 544, 545, 546, 547 (1986)
Gibbons: The Woods So Wild (Vanguard 72021)

Collections
16th Century English Keyboard Music, CRD (1976)
A Choice Collection of Lessons and Ayres (17th and 18th Century English Keyboard Music), CRD
at the Victoria and Albert Museum, CRD (1974)
The Harmonious Blacksmith: Favourite Harpsichord Works (1983)
Suites by Purcell and Handel and Sonatas by Haydn, Wigmore Hall Live (2009)

Harpsichord concertos
J. S. Bach: harpsichord concertos BWV 1052–1058, concertos for 2, 3 and 4 harpsichords 1060–1065 (Kenneth Gilbert, Lars Ulrik Mortensen and Nicholas Kraemer, harpsichords 2–4) (1979–1981)
J. S. Bach: concerto for harpsichord, violin and flute BWV 1044 (on the recording 3 concerti) (1984)
J. S. Bach: Brandenburg Concerto no. 5 BWV 1050 (on his two recordings of the Brandenburg concertos) (1979–1982 and 2006)
Sons of Bach harpsichord concertos: C. P. E. Bach: Wq.14, Wq.43; J. C. Bach/Mozart: concerto in D major; CRD (1974)
Arne: Harpsichord concerto no.5 in G minor (on A Grand Concert of Musick) (1979)
Haydn: Concerto for Harpsichord and Orchestra Hob. XVIII:11 (on Haydn: concertos and Pachelbel: Canon and Gigue) (1985)
Leigh: Concertino for Harpsichord and String Orchestra with Nicholas Braithwaite conducting the London Philharmonic Orchestra; he also plays in Leigh's Midsummer Night's Dream suite; Lyrita records (1980)
Poulenc: Concert champêtre with Seiji Ozawa conducting the Boston Symphony Orchestra (live recording), Deutsche Grammophon (1991)

Chamber music
J. C. Bach: 3 Quintets, Sextet (also playing fortepiano and square piano) with members of The English Concert (1988)
J. S. Bach: sonatas for flute and harpsichord BWV 1030–1032 with Stephen Preston (baroque flute) and sonatas for flute and continuo BWV 1033–1035 with the addition of Jordi Savall (viola da gamba), CRD
J. S. Bach: sonatas for flute and harpsichord BWV 1020, 1030–1032 with Jean-Pierre Rampal (modern flute) and sonatas for flute and continuo BWV 1033–1035 with the addition of Roland Pidoux (cello), CBS Records (1985)
J. S. Bach: sonatas for flute BWV 1020, 1030, 1032 and sonata for flute and harpsichord BWV 1031 with Emmanuel Pahud, sonatas for flute BWV 1033–1035 with the addition of Jonathan Manson (cello); sonata for two flutes BWV 1039 with the further addition of Silvia Careddu (flute), EMI Classics (2008)
J. S. Bach: sonatas for violin and harpsichord BWV 1014–1019 with Rachel Podger (violin) and BWV 1019a and the sonatas for violin and continuo BWV 1021, 1023 with the addition of Jonathan Manson (viola da gamba), Channel Classics (2000)
J. S. Bach: sonatas for viola da gamba and harpsichord BWV 1027–1029, 1030b (an early version of the flute sonata) with Jonathan Manson, Avie (2006)
Corelli: Trio Sonatas with members of The English Concert (1987)
Handel: Trio Sonatas with members of The English Concert (1985)
Rameau: Pièces de Clavecin en Concerts with Rachel Podger and Jonathan Manson, Channel Classics (2002)
Soler: Six Concertos for Two Keyboard Instruments (playing harpsichord and fortepiano) with Kenneth Gilbert (1979)
Wesley: Duet for Organ in C major with Simon Preston on his recording Early English Keyboard Music (1986)
The Punckes Delight and other seventeenth-century English music for viol and keyboard (virginal and chamber organ) with Jordi Savall, Argo Records (1978)
The Flute King: Music from the court of Frederick the Great. Featuring Emmanuel Pahud on flute. One disc of flute concertos and one of flute sonatas; Trevor Pinnock directs the  orchestra and plays harpsichord continuo. Jonathan Manson plays cello continuo. EMI Classics (2011).

Orchestral works with The English Concert
Trevor Pinnock generally directs while playing harpsichord continuo. Recordings on Archiv Produktion unless otherwise indicated.

By composer
C. P. E. Bach: 6 symphonies for strings, Wq.182 (1979)
C. P. E. Bach: flute concertos Wq.166 and Wq.167 (Stephen Preston, flute) (1980)
J. S. Bach: Brandenburg concertos (1982)
J. S. Bach: Orchestral Suites nos. 1 & 3 (1978)
J. S. Bach: Orchestral Suite no. 2 and concerto for harpsichord, violin and flute BWV 1044 (Simon Standage, violin; Stephen Preston, flute) (1978)
J. S. Bach: Orchestral Suite no. 4 and Brandenburg concerto no. 5 (1979)
J. S. Bach: Orchestral Suites (Lisa Beznosiuk, flute) and cantata sinfonias BWV 110, 174, 249, 42, 52 (1993)
J. S. Bach: single and double violin concertos (Simon Standage, Elizabeth Wilcock, violins) (1983)
J. S. Bach: 3 concerti: concerto for oboe d'amore BWV 1055, concerto for oboe and violin BWV 1060 and concerto for harpsichord, violin and flute BWV 1044 (1984)
Boyce: 8 Symphonies, op.2 (1986)
Corelli: 12 concerti grossi op.6 (1988)
Fasch: Concertos and Orchestral Suite (1995)
Handel: 6 concerti grossi op.3 (1984)
Handel: 12 concerti grossi op.6 (1985)
Handel: Water Music (1983)
Handel: Music for the Royal Fireworks and concerti a due cori nos.2 and 3 (no.1 is on Christmas Concertos) (1985)
Handel: Music for the Royal Fireworks (original version of 1749), concertos, occasional suite (1995)
Handel: Concerto grosso Alexander's Feast HWV 318, sonata à cinque HWV 288, concertos for oboe HWV 287, 301, 302a (Simon Standage, violin; David Reichenberg, oboe) (1984)
Handel: Overtures from Samson, il pastor fido, Agrippina, Alceste, Saul and Teseo (1986)
Handel: Organ concertos op.4, op.7 and HWV 295, 296, 304 (Simon Preston, organ) (1984)
Handel: Coronation Anthems (with Simon Preston conducting the choir of Westminster Abbey) (1982)
Handel: Dettingen Te Deum, Dettingen Anthem (with Simon Preston conducting the choir of Westminster Abbey) (1984)
Handel: Ode for St. Cecilia's Day (Felicity Lott, soprano; Anthony Rolfe Johnson, tenor) (1985)
Handel: Italian cantatas: Silete venti HWV 242; Cecilia, vogli un sguardo HWV 89 (Jennifer Smith, soprano; John Elwes, tenor) (1987)
Handel: Messiah (Arleen Auger, soprano; Anne Sofie von Otter, contralto; Michael Chance, countertenor; Howard Crook, tenor; John Tomlinson, bass) (1988)
Handel: Belshazzar (1990)
Handel: Acis and Galatea in Mozart's arrangement K.566 (1991)
Handel: Tamerlano (2001); CD: Avie records (live recording, London), DVD: Arthaus Musik (live recording, Halle)
Haydn: concertos for oboe, trumpet and harpsichord (Hob.XVIII:11) (Paul Goodwin, oboe; Mark Bennett, trumpet; Trevor Pinnock, harpsichord) (1985)
Haydn: violin concertos; Salomon: Romance for violin (Simon Standage, violin) (1989)
Haydn: Stabat mater (1990)
Haydn: missa in angustiis (Nelson mass), te deum (1987)
Haydn: missa sancti Nicolai, Theresienmesse (1993)
Haydn: symphonies le matin, le midi, le soir, (nos. 6, 7, 8) (1987)
Haydn: Sturm und Drang symphonies (nos. 26, 35, 38, 39, 41, 42, 43, 44, 45, 46, 47, 48, 49, 50, 51, 52, 58, 59, 65) (1989–1991)
Mozart: complete symphonies (1992–1995)
Mozart: Krönungsmesse "Coronation Mass", Exsultate jubilate and Vesperae solennes de confessore (1994)
Purcell: Dido and Aeneas (1991)
Purcell: Timon of Athens and Dioclesian (1995)
Purcell: King Arthur (1991)
Purcell: Odes: Come, ye sons of art, away; Ode for St. Cecilia's Day; Of old, when heroes thought it base (the Yorkshire feast song) (1989)
Purcell: choral works with the choir of Christ Church, Oxford, conducted by Simon Preston
Telemann: 3 Orchestral Suites for 3 oboes and bassoon TWV 55: C6 and B10, for 2 hunting horns TWV 55: D19 (1993)
Telemann: Suites, Concerto in D Major for 3 oboes & bassoon TWV 55: g4 and D1, for 3 trumpets TWV 54: D4 (1994)
Vivaldi: 12 concertos il cimento dell'armonia e dell'inventione op.8 (Simon Standage, violin); flute concerto RV 429, cello concerto RV 424; CRD records (1978)
Vivaldi: le quattro stagioni (Simon Standage, violin) (1982)
Vivaldi: 12 concertos for 1,2 and 4 violins l'estro Armonico op.3 (Simon Standage, Micaela Comberti, Elizabeth Wilcock, Miles Golding, violins) (1987)
Vivaldi: 12 concertos for violin la stravaganza op.4 (Simon Standage, violin) (1990)
Vivaldi: 7 concerti for woodwind and strings (1995)
Vivaldi: Concerto alla rustica (1986)
Vivaldi: concerti l'amoroso (1987)
Vivaldi: 6 concerti for flute op.10 (Lisa Beznosiuk, flute) (1988)
Vivaldi: Gloria; A. Scarlatti: dixit dominus (1988)
Vivaldi: stabat mater, salve regina, nisi dominus (Michael Chance, countertenor); sinfonia for strings RV 169 (1995)

Collections
Christmas Concertos (1988)
Pachelbel: Canon and Gigue (1990)
A Grand Concert of Musick: English Baroque Concertos (1979)
Christmas in Rome: Vivaldi: Gloria; Corelli: Christmas Concerto; A. Scarlatti: O di Betlemme altera povertà (on video and CD) (1992)
Opera Arias by Mozart, Haydn and Gluck (Anne-Sofie von Otter, mezzo-soprano) (1995)
Oboe Concertos: C. P. E. Bach, Wq.165; Lebrun, no.1; Mozart, K.314. (Paul Goodwin, oboe) (1990)

Conducting
Exquisite Fires: Music of Linda Bouchard with the National Arts Centre Orchestra; Marquis Classics (1998)
Renée Fleming: Sacred Songs in Concert from Mainz Cathedral with the Deutsche Kammerphilharmonie Bremen and the Mainzer Domchor; Decca records (2005) (on DVD only)
J. S. Bach: The Brandenburg Concertos with the European Brandenburg Ensemble, (2007), Avie

Notes and references

External links
 
 Buying a harpsichord – by Trevor Pinnock
 Bach-cantatas.com: Trevor Pinnock – good selection of photos
 

British choral conductors
British male conductors (music)
English harpsichordists
Fortepianists
Virginal players
British performers of early music
Founders of early music ensembles
Academics of the Royal Academy of Music
Honorary Members of the Royal Academy of Music
Alumni of the Royal College of Music
Washington University in St. Louis people
Commanders of the Order of the British Empire
People educated at Simon Langton Grammar School for Boys
Musicians from Kent
People from Canterbury
1946 births
Living people
Handel Prize winners
21st-century British conductors (music)
21st-century British male musicians